Tahoma is the original form of the word "Tacoma", as in the city of Tacoma, Washington. It can refer to:

Places 
 Mount Tahoma, an alternative spelling of Mount Tacoma, the original name of Mount Rainier
 Little Tahoma Peak, a satellite peak of Mount Rainier
 Tahoma Glacier, a glacier on Mount Rainier
 South Tahoma Glacier, a glacier on Mount Rainier
 Mount Tahoma High School, a high school in the district of Tacoma, Washington
 Tahoma, California,  a town on the west shore of Lake Tahoe
 Tahoma National Cemetery, a cemetery in Kent, Washington
 Tahoma School District, a school district in Maple Valley, Washington
 Tahoma Senior High School, a senior high school in this district
 Lake Tahoma, a lake in western North Carolina

Computers
 Tahoma (typeface), a typeface bundled with Microsoft Windows

Transport 
 Air Tahoma, an American-based cargo transport airline
 USS Tahoma (1861), a steamer acquired by the Union Navy during the American Civil War
 USCGC Tahoma (WPG-80), a United States Coast Guard cutter completed in 1934
 USCGC Tahoma (WMEC-908), a United States Coast Guard medium endurance cutter commissioned in 1988

See also
Tacoma (disambiguation)
Takoma (disambiguation)